Thorati is a 2019 Indian Tamil drama film directed by Marimuthu. It stars Shaman Mithru and Sathyakala in the lead roles, alongside a cast featuring predominantly newcomers. Featuring music composed by Ved Shankar, the film began production in mid-2018 was released on 2 August 2019.

Cast
Shaman Mithru as Mayan
Sathyakala as Semponnu
Azhagu as Mayan's father
Janaki as Mayan's mother
R Nandaa (Sundar Raj) as Senthathi
Vazhakku En Muthuraman as Eepulli
Jayaseelan as Sothamutti

Production
Set in the 1980s, the film was shot across southern regions of Tamil Nadu such as Dindigul, Madurai, Pudukottai, Ramanathapuram and Sivagangai during early 2018. The director, P. Marimuthu, suggested that the story of the film was drawn from real life experiences in rural Tamil Nadu. The film's producer and lead actor, Shaman Mithru, stated that the film's making and characterisations were along the lines of those seen in Paruthiveeran (2007), Subramaniyapuram (2008) and Vaagai Sooda Vaa (2011). Actors were trained for six months, and a mock shoot was held for five days before production had started.

Impressed by the film, producer C. V. Kumar initially agreed to distribute the film through his Thirukumaran Entertainment banner. He later pulled out of the commitment. The makers then screened the film at a few international film festivals, as the film experienced trouble in getting a theatrical release in Tamil Nadu.

Soundtrack
The film's soundtrack was composed by Ved Shankar and Jithin K. Roshan. The lyrics were written by Snehan.
"Potta Kaadellam" - Manikka Vinayagam, Chinnaponnu, Gowtham Bharadwaj, Anitha Karthikeyan
"Kullanari" - Anthony Daasan
"Saukaaram Pottu" - Vijay Prakash, Kalyani Nair
"Yelle Yelle" - Kalyani Nair
"Usura Urukki" - Vijay Prakash
"Aal Illa" - Chinnaponnu
"Love"
"Marriage"

Release
The film had a low profile opening across Tamil Nadu on 2 August 2019. In its review, The Times of India gave a positive impression and wrote the film "starts off as a lackadaisical narration [but] moves steadily once the major plot unfolds", adding that "the cinematography, which captures the village in all its beauty and the effortless performance from the heroine and the trio are positives of the film.". The News Minute labelled it as "a simple romance drama engaging told", while The New Indian Express wrote that it was a "tightly-knit emotional tale of love and loss". In contrast, The Hindu noted that it was "an outdated independent film about an outdated subject, featuring outdated characters."

Soon after the film's release, it garnered media attention as the lead actress Sathyakala was abducted by her father and stepmother against her will for acting in the film.

References

External links

 Thorati on ZEE5

2019 films
Films scored by Ved Shankar
2010s Tamil-language films
2019 drama films
Indian drama films